Sir George Aylwen, 1st Baronet (12 November 1880 – 27 September 1967) was a British financier and the 621st Lord Mayor of London from 1948 to 1949.

Career
In 1896, Aylwen began work as a clerk at stockbrokers J & A Scrimgeour, eventually rising to senior partner by 1948, the year he became Lord Mayor.

Shortly after beginning his career, he was sent to Africa during the Boer War with the Royal Fusiliers. He earned the Queen's Medal with four clasps. Despite being blinded in one eye, he returned to serve with the Royal Fusiliers during the First World War.

He was treasurer of St Bartholomew's Hospital from 1937. Girling Ball – dean of the hospital from 1930 to 1945 – recorded in his diary in 1939 that Aylen treated the clinical staff like children. Aylwen was initially concerned about plans for the development of a National Health Service in the 1940s, worried that it would impede the freedom of the voluntary hospitals and, though he came to support the plans, he used his position as chair of the Voluntary Hospitals Committee for London to ask for existing hospital boards to be kept on.

Lord Mayor of London

After a term as one of the two sheriffs of the City of London in 1946–7, he was elected Lord Mayor of London on 29 September 1948, to succeed Sir Frederick Wells, and took office on 9 November. Less than a week later, he was the second person to be officially notified of the birth of Charles, Prince of Wales on 14 November, after the Home Secretary, James Chuter Ede, who had to be officially notified himself as the centuries-old tradition that the Home Secretary be present in person for a royal birth was abolished.

In 1949, at the Savoy Hotel he toasted Danny Kaye with "I'd like to see every meeting of ministers preceded by a little turn of Danny Kaye. That might even have an effect on  Mr. Vyshinsky of the Soviet Union". The toast and Kaye's response, beginning "I think emotions are the same the world over", were covered in the papers in both the UK and the US, a fact ridiculed by Life magazine.

At the Lord Mayor's Show on 9 November 1949, when he was being taken to the swearing-in of his successor, Sir Frederick Rowland, the two horses leading his coach bolted into the crowd, hospitalizing around a dozen people. He completed the journey in Sir Frederick's coach instead.

Honours
Aylwen became a knight bachelor of the United Kingdom in the 1942 New Year Honours. He was made a hereditary (to male heirs only) baronet "of Saint Bartholomew's in the City of London" on 25 November 1949. The new baronetcy became extinct upon his death in 1967.

Personal life
He had two daughters, Marjorie, born 1906, and Margaret, born 1909, and two grandchildren, Michael Lampson, born 1936, and David Lampson, born 1939. He divorced his first wife, Edith Eliza Caroline Hill, in 1951 and married playwright Ingraa Elena D'etter Bulgarides.

In 1963, he and his wife, Lady Ingraa Aylwen, employed Archibald Hall (alias Roy Fontaine) as their butler after he impersonated his own employer when Lady Aylwen called to take references. Hall claimed to have stolen jewellery from the Aylwens' guests and to have been seduced by Lady Aylwen. Hall was convicted of four murders in the 1970s, including that of MP Walter Scott-Elliot, and died in prison in 2002.

References

External links
 Footage of the 1948 Lord Mayor's Show from British Pathé
 Photograph of Sir George Aylwen at the National Portrait Gallery, London

1880 births
1967 deaths
People from Ilford
English stockbrokers
Knights Bachelor
Sheriffs of the City of London
20th-century lord mayors of London
20th-century English politicians
Baronets in the Baronetage of the United Kingdom
20th-century English businesspeople
British military personnel of the Second Boer War